Crime in Formula One is a 1984 Italian "poliziottesco"-comedy film written and directed by Bruno Corbucci. It is the tenth chapter in the Nico Giraldi film series starred by Tomas Milian.

Plot
At the Italian Grand Prix at Monza a great champion becomes the victim of a mysterious accident. An ugly mess, until an unusual cop arrives from Rome, very rude in manner, in colorful dress and with a head full of very unconventional ideas...

Cast 

Tomas Milian as inspector Nico Giraldi 
Bombolo as Venticello
Pino Colizzi as  Martelli
Dagmar Lassander as Miss Martelli
Olimpia Di Nardo as Angela Giraldi 
Sergio Di Pinto as Fabrizio 
Licinia Lentini as Rossana
Isabel Russinova as RDS DJ
Maria Grazia Buccella as Gambling-room attendant 
Enzo Garinei as Judge La Bella
Marcello Martana as Trentini
Massimo Vanni as Gargiulo
Aldo Ralli as Daniele Bertoni
Ennio Antonelli as Osvaldo Bonanni

See also 
 List of Italian films of 1984

References

External links

1984 films
Italian auto racing films
Italian crime comedy films
Films directed by Bruno Corbucci
Films scored by Fabio Frizzi
Poliziotteschi films
Films set in Rome
Formula One mass media
1980s crime comedy films
1984 comedy films
1980s Italian-language films
1980s Italian films